Avdhash Kaushal (1934/1935 – 12 July 2022) was an Indian academic, environmentalist and activist. He was awarded a Padma Shri in 1986.

Early life
Avadesh Kaushal was born in Meerut.

Career
Avdhash Kaushal was an Associate professor for 3 years in Lal Bahadur Shastri National Academy of Administration in Mussoorie.

He headed an NGO Rural Litigation and Entitlement Kendra (RLEK) which works, among others, to promote the cause of the Van Gujjars: an indigenous forest-dwelling nomadic tribe of the northern Himalayas. Campaigns include literacy, elementary health and veterinary care, and community forest management.

Death
He died in Dehradun on 12 July 2022 at the age of 87.

References

Explanatory notes

External links
 Interview

1930s births
2022 deaths
Activists from Uttar Pradesh
People from Meerut
Recipients of the Padma Shri in social work
People from Mussoorie
Year of birth missing